Jean-Paul Brisson (11 September 1918 – 25 June 2006) was a French honorary professor of Latin language and civilisation at the Paris West University Nanterre La Défense. He devoted himself particularly to the social problems of antiquity, North Africa during Antiquity and classical poets.

He participated with other colleagues committed to the left (Elena Cassin, Maxime Rodinson, Maurice Godelier, Charles Malamoud, André-Georges Haudricourt, Jean Yoyotte, Jean Bottero) in a Marxist think tank organised by Jean-Pierre Vernant. This group took on an institutional form with the creation, in 1964, of the Centre des recherches comparées sur les sociétés anciennes, which later became the Centre Louis Gernet, focusing more on the study of ancient Greece.

Works
1949: Gloire et misère de l'Afrique chrétienne, Bibliothèque chrétienne d'histoire
1958: Autonomisme et christianisme dans l'Afrique romaine, de Septime Sévère à l'invasion vandale, É. de Boccard
1959: Spartacus, 
1966: Virgile, son temps et le nôtre, François Maspero
1973: Carthage ou Rome, Fayard
1992: Rome et l'âge d'or, de Catulle à Ovide, histoire d'un mythe, La Découverte,
2005: Traité des Mystères d'Hilaire de Poitiers, bilingual edition, Éditions du Cerf

References

External links 
 Rome et l'âge d'or. De Catulle à Ovide, vie et mort d'un mythe (compte rend) on Persée
  Spartacus by Jean-Paul Brisson review on JSTOR
 Rome et l'âge d'or; De Catulle à Ovide, vie et mort d'un mythe on La Découverte

20th-century French historians
French scholars of Roman history
1918 births
2006 deaths